The alpine field mouse (Apodemus alpicola)  is a species of rodent in the family Muridae.
It is found in Austria, France, Italy, Germany, and Switzerland.

References

Apodemus
Rodents of Europe
Mammals described in 1952
Taxonomy articles created by Polbot